Saline County is the name of several counties in the United States:

 Saline County, Arkansas
 Saline County, Illinois
 Saline County, Kansas
 Saline County, Missouri
 Saline County, Nebraska

See also